Climate change in Europe has resulted in an increase in temperature of 1.9 °C (2019) in Europe compared to pre-industrial levels. Europe's climate is getting warmer due to anthropogenic activity. According to international climate experts, global temperature rise should not exceed 2 °C to prevent the most dangerous consequences of climate change; without reduction in greenhouse gas emissions, this could happen before 2050. Climate change has implications for all regions of Europe, with the extent and nature of impacts varying across the continent.

Impacts on European countries include warmer weather and increasing frequency and intensity of extreme weather such as heat waves, bringing health risks and impacts on ecosystems. European countries are major contributors to global greenhouse gas emissions, although the European Union and governments of several countries have outlined plans to implement climate change mitigation and an energy transition in the 21st century, the European Green Deal being one of these. The European Union commissioner of climate action is Frans Timmermans since 1 December 2019.

Public opinion in Europe shows concern about climate change; in the European Investment Bank's Climate Survey of 2020, 90% of Europeans believe their children will experience the effects of climate change in their daily lives. Climate change activism and businesses shifting their practices has taken place in Europe.

Greenhouse gas emissions 

 
A 2016 European Environment Agency (EEA) report documents greenhouse gas (GHG) emissions between 1990 and 2014 for the EU-28 individual member states by IPCC sector. Total greenhouse gas emissions fell by 24% between 1990 and 2014, but road transport emissions rose by 17%. Cars, vans, and trucks had the largest absolute increase in CO2 emissions of any sector over the last 25 years, growing by 124Mt. Aviation also grew by 93Mt over the same period, a massive 82% increase.

In 2019 European Union emissions reached 3.3 Gt (3.3 billion metric tons), 80% of which was from fossil fuels.

In 2021, the European Parliament approved a landmark law setting GHG targets for 2050. The law aims to achieve carbon neutrality and, after 2050, negative emissions and paves the way for a policy overhaul in the European Union. Under the law, the European Union must act to lower net GHG emissions by at least 55% by 2030 (compared to 1990). The law sets a limit of 225 Mt of CO2 equivalent to the contribution of removals to the target. According to Swedish lawmaker Jytte Guteland, the law would allow Europe to become the first carbon-neutral continent by 2050.

Energy consumption

Coal 

The coal consumption in Europe was 7,239 TWh in 1985 and has fallen to 2,611 TWh in 2020. The coal consumption in the EU was 5,126 TWh in 1985 and has fallen to 1,624 TWh in 2020. The height of CO2 emissions from coal in Europe were in 1987 with 3.31 billion tonnes, and in 2019 with 1.36 billion tonnes.

Russia had the most CO2 emissions from coal in Europe in 2019 (395.03 Mt), Germany had the second most CO2 emissions from coal in Europe (235.7 Mt). Iceland's CO2 emissions from coal grew 151%, Turkey's CO2 emissions from coal grew 131% between and Montenegro CO2 emissions from coal grew 13% between 1990 and 2019, the rest of the European countries had a decrease in coal consumption in that period of time.

From 2012 to 2018 in the EU coal fell by around 50TWh, compared to a rise of 30TWh in wind power and solar energy generation and a rise of 30TWh in gas generation. The remaining 10TWh covered a small structural increase in electricity consumption. In 2019 coal generation will be about 12% of the EU's 2019 greenhouse gas emissions.

Fossil gas 

According to Global Energy Monitor plans to expand infrastructure contradict EU climate goals.

Agriculture 
Greenhouse gases are also released through agriculture. Livestock production is common in Europe, responsible for 42% of land in Europe. This land use for livestock does affect the environment. Agriculture accounts for 10% of Europe's greenhouse gas emissions, this percentage being even larger in other parts of the world. Along with this percentage, agriculture is also responsible for being the largest contributor of non carbon dioxide greenhouse gas emissions being emitted annually in Europe. Agriculture has been found to release other gases besides carbon dioxides such as methane and nitrous oxide. A study claimed that 38% of greenhouse gases released through agriculture in Europe were methane. These farms release methane through chemicals in fertilizers used, manure, and a process called enteric fermentation. These gases are estimated to possibly cause even more damage than carbon dioxide, a study by Environmental Research Letters claims that "CH4 has 20 times more heat-trapping potential than CO2 and N2O has 300 times more." These emissions released through agriculture are also linked to soil acidification and loss of biodiversity in Europe as well.

Europe is attempting to take action. The Land Use Change and Forestry (LULUCF) was created, focusing on lowering the amount of greenhouse gas emissions through land use in Europe. Some success was seen, between 1990 and 2016, greenhouse gases emitted through agriculture in Europe decreased by 20%. However, the European Union has a plan to become carbon neutral by 2050. If more policies are not implemented or if there is no dietary shift, it has been concluded the European Union may not reach this goal.

According to the European Green Deal, it is critical to minimize reliance on pesticides and antimicrobials, eliminate excess fertilization (particularly nitrogen and phosphorus), promote organic farming, improve animal welfare, and reverse biodiversity loss. The introduction and successful implementation of sustainable agriculture can assist developing nations improve their food security, as well as strengthening soil and plan carbon sinks globally.

Transport

Shipping 
Greenhouse gas emissions from shipping equal the carbon footprint of a quarter of passenger cars in Europe. In France, Germany, UK, Spain, Sweden and Finland, shipping emissions in 2018 were larger than the emissions from all the passenger cars registered in 10 or more of the largest cities in each country. Despite the scale emissions, they are not part of emissions reduction targets made by countries as part of the Paris Agreement on climate change.

Other greenhouse gases

Hydrofluorocarbons
Trifluoromethane (HFC-23) is generated and emitted as a byproduct during the production of chlorodifluoromethane (HCFC-22). HCFC-22 is used both in emissive applications (primarily air conditioning and refrigeration) and as a feedstock for production of  synthetic polymers. Because HCFC-22 depletes stratospheric ozone, its production for non-feedstock uses is scheduled to be phased out under the Montreal Protocol. However, feedstock production is permitted to continue indefinitely.

In the developed world, HFC-23 emissions decreased between 1990 and 2000 due to process optimization and thermal destruction, although there were increased emissions in the intervening years.

The United States (U.S.) and the European Union drove these trends in the developed world. Although emissions increased in the EU between 1990 and 1995 due to increased production of HCFC-22, a combination of process optimization and thermal oxidation led to a sharp decline in EU emissions after 1995, resulting in a net decrease in emissions of 67 percent for this region between 1990 and 2000.

Methane

The decline in methane emissions from 1990 to 1995 in the OECD is largely due to non-climate regulatory programs and the collection and flaring or use of landfill methane. In many OECD countries, landfill methane emissions are not expected to grow, despite continued or even increased waste generation, because of non-climate change-related regulations that result in mitigation of air emissions, collection of gas, or closure of facilities. A major driver in the OECD is the European Union Landfill Directive, which limits the amount of organic matter that can enter solid waste facilities. Although the organic matter is expected to decrease rapidly in the EU, emissions occur as a result of total waste in place. Emissions will have a gradual decline over time.

Impacts on the natural environment

Temperature and weather changes 

The World Meteorological Organization's State of the Climate 2021 stated that temperatures in Europe increased at more than twice the global average over the preceding 30 years–the highest increase of any continent in the world. The European Environment Agency stated that from pre-industrial times, European land temperatures have increased by 1.94–1.99 °C, faster than the global average increase of 1.11–1.14 °C.

The Arctic sea ice decreased 33.000 km2 between 1979 and 2020 per year during the winter and 79.000 km2 per year during the summer in the same period of time. If temperatures are kept below 1.5 °C  warming ice free Arctic summers would be rare but it would be a frequent event with a 2 °C warming.

In the Baltic Sea ice melting has been seen since 1800 and with an acceleration happening since the 1980s. Sea ice was at a record low in the winter of 2019–2020.

These extreme weather changes may increase the severity of diseases in animals as well as humans. The heat waves will increase the number of forest fires. Experts have warned that the climate change may increase the number of global climate refugees from 150 million in 2008 to 800 million in future. International agreement of refugees does not recognize the climate change refugees.

A study of future changes in flood, heat-waves, and drought impacts for 571 European cities, using climate model runs from the coupled model intercomparison project Phase 5 (CMIP5) found that heat-wave days increase across all cities, but especially in southern Europe, whilst the greatest heatwave temperature increases are expected in central European cities. For the low impact scenario drought conditions intensify in southern European cities while river flooding worsens in northern European cities. However, the high impact scenario projects that most European cities will see increases in both drought and river flood risks. Over 100 cities are particularly vulnerable to two or more climate impacts.

Extreme weather events 

The summer of 2019 brought a series of high temperature records in Western Europe. During a heat wave a glaciological rarity in the form of a previously unseen lake emerged in the Mont Blanc Massif in the French Alps, at the foot of the Dent du Géant at an altitude of about 3400 meters, that was considered as evidence for the effects of global warming on the glaciers.

Impact on flora 
In the aftermath of the 2003 heat wave, researchers noted how the alpine ecosystems of Italy were affected. Namely, the heat wave "triggered a rapid expansion of vascular plant species at the expense of mosses in peatlands". Peatlands are known to be supreme carbon-storing environments, and thus alterations caused by anthropogenic climate change poses a threat to long-term climate stability.

Impacts on people

Health impacts

Heat waves 

In the absence of climate change, extreme heat waves in Europe would be expected to occur only once every several hundred years. In addition to hydrological changes, grain crops mature earlier at a higher temperature, which may reduce the critical growth period and lead to lower grain yields. The Russian heat wave in 2010 caused grain harvest down by 25%, government ban wheat exports, and losses were 1% of GDP. The Russian heat wave 2010 estimate for deaths is 55,000.

A study of future changes in flood, heat-waves, and drought impacts for 571 European cities, using climate model runs from the Coupled Model Inter-comparison Project Phase 5 (CMIP5) found that heat-wave days increase across all cities, but especially in southern Europe, whilst the greatest heatwave temperature increases are expected in central European cities. For the low impact scenario, drought conditions intensify in southern European cities while river flooding worsens in northern European cities. However, the high impact scenario projects that most European cities will see increases in both drought and river flood risks. Over 100 cities are particularly vulnerable to two or more climate impacts.

The summer of 2003 was probably the hottest in Europe since at least AD 1500, and unusually large numbers of heat-related deaths were reported in France, Germany and Italy. It is very likely that the heat wave was human-induced by greenhouse gases.

These extreme weather changes may increase the severity of diseases in animals as well as humans. The heat waves will increase the number of forest fires. Experts have warned that climate change may increase the number of global climate refugees from 150 million in 2008 to 800 million in future. International agreement of refugees does not recognize the climate change refugees.

The heat wave in 2018 in England, which would take hundreds of lives, would have had 30 times less of a chance of happening, without climate change. By 2050, such patterns would occur every 2 years if the current rate of warming continues.

The heat wave in summer of 2019 as of June 28, claimed human lives, caused closing or taking special measures in 4,000 schools in France only, and big wildfires. Many areas declared state of emergency and advised the public to avoid "risky behaviour" like leaving children in cars or jogging outside in the middle of the day".  The heatwave was made at least 5 times more likely by climate change and possibly even 100 times.

In 2022, severe heatwaves occurred in Western Europe. Only in Spain from 10 to 16 of July 510 people died from heat directly. Wildfires emerged in different places and burned vast territories. Dozens of thousand people fled them.

Diseases 

In 2019 for the first time, cases of Zika fever were diagnosed in Europe not because people traveled to tropical countries like Brazil, but from local mosquitos. Evidence indicating that the warming climate change in the area is the primary cause of this fever. It is thought that climate change could lead to dengue fever epidemics in Europe by 2100 if Aedes mosquito vectors become established.

Mitigation 

In the beginning of the 21st century the European Union, began to conceive the European Green Deal as its main program of climate change mitigation. The European Union claims that it has already achieved its 2020 target for emission reduction and has the legislation needed to achieve the 2030 targets. Already in 2018, its GHG emissions were 23% lower than in 1990.

Paris Agreement 
On April 22, 2016, the Paris Climate Accords were signed by all but three countries around the world. The conference to talk about this document was held in Paris, France. This put Europe in the epicenter of talks about the environment and climate change.  The EU was the first major economy that decided to submit its intended contribution to the new agreement in March 2015. The EU ratified the Paris Agreement on October 5, 2015.

In these talks the countries agreed that they all had a long-term goal of keeping global warming to well below 2 degrees Celsius. They agreed that global emissions need to peak as soon as possible, and recognize that this will take longer for developing countries. On the subject of transparency the countries agreed that they would meet every five years to set ambitious goals, report their progress to the public and each other, and track progress for their long-term goals throughout a transparent and accountable system.

The countries recognized the importance of non-party stakeholders to be involved in this process. Cities, regions, and local authorities are encouraged to uphold and promote regional and international cooperation.

The Paris agreement is a legally international agreement, its main goal is to limit global warming to below 1.5 degrees Celsius, compared to pre-industrial levels. The Nationally Determined Contributions (NDC's) are the plans to fight climate change adapted for each country. Every party in the agreement has different targets based on its own historical climate records and country's circumstances and all the targets for each country are stated in their NDC.

National determined goals based on NDC's 
In the case for member countries of the European Union the goals are very similar and the European Union work with a common strategy within the Paris agreement. The NDC target for countries of the European Union against climate change and greenhouse gas emissions under the Paris agreement are the following:

 40% reduction in Greenhouse gas emissions until 2030, compared to 1990. This reduction is covered in these four sections;

 European Union Emission Trading System
 Outside the EU emissions trading system
 Land use, land-use change, and forestry (LULUCF)
 Domestic institutional legislation and mitigation measure

 55% reduction of greenhouse gases by domestic binding target without contribution from international credits, until 2030 compared to 1990.
 Gases covered in reduction: Carbon Dioxide (CO2), Methane (CH4), Nitrous oxide (N2O), Hydrofluorocarbon (HFCs), Perfluorinated compound (PFCs), Sulfur hexafluoride (SF6) and Nitrogen trifluoride (NF3).
 40% reduction of emissions from outside the European Union Emission Trading System (EU ETS) until 2030, compared to 2005.

Strategy to achieve NDC's 
Each country has different ways to achieve the established goals depending on resources. In the case of the European union the following approach is established to support the NDC's climate change plan:

 Each member state must report land use and subsequently report compensatory measures for the removal of carbon dioxide from the atmosphere.
 Targets for improved energy efficiency and an increased amount of renewable energy have been established. Until the year 2030, energy consumption will be improved by 32.5%.
 The CO2 emission per km must be reduced by 30–37.5% depending on vehicles by 2030
 Limit sales of F-gas, prohibited products and prevent emissions in existing products with F-gases. This is expected to reduce emissions of F-gases by 66% by 2030 compared to 2014.
 Multiannual Financial Framework,(MFF), for 2021–2027. MFF will finance climate action, such as policies and programs. MFF shall contribute to climate neutrality by 2050 and to achieving the 2030 climate targets.
 Within the European Union Emission Trading System (EU ETS) a cap on the maximum allowable amount of emissions established. From year 2021 this will also be applied in aviation. The EU ETS is an important tool in EU policy to reduce Greenhouse gas emission in a cost effective way. Under the 'cap and trade' principle, a maximum (cap) is set on the total amount of greenhouse gases that can be emitted by all participating installations.
A survey conducted by the European Investment Bank in 2020 found that although 45% of EU companies have invested in climate change mitigation or adaptation measures, compared to 32% in the US, fewer companies plan future investment in the next three years. 40% of European companies want to invest in climate initiatives during the next three years. The proportion of investment in 2020 varies from 50% in Western and Northern Europe to 32% in Central and Eastern Europe. The majority of European companies, 75%, say regulatory and tax uncertainty is preventing them from investing in climate-related projects.

According to their 2020 Municipality Survey, 56% of European Union municipalities increased climate investment, while 66% believe their climate investment over the previous three years has been insufficient.

The study did not check other greenhouse gases like methane. The authors called to ensure that the energy sources will really reduce emissions.

Climate Targets 

The climate commitments of the European Union are divided into 3 main categories: targets for the year 2020, 2030 and 2050. The European Union claim that its policies are in line with the goal of the Paris Agreement. The programm of response to climate change in Europe is called European Green Deal. In April of the year 2020 the European Parliament called to include the European Green Deal in the recovery program from the COVID-19 pandemic.

Targets for the year 2020:

 Reduce GHG emissions by 20% from the level in 1990.
 Produce 20% of energy from renewable sources.
 Increase Energy Efficiency by 20%.

Targets for the year 2030:

 Reduce GHG emission by 55% from the level in 1990.
 Produce 32% of energy from renewables.
 Increase energy efficiency by 32.5%.

Targets for the year 2050:

 Became climate neutral.

Policies and legislation for mitigation 

There is in place national legislation, international agreements and EU directives. The EU directive 2001/77/EU promotes renewable energy in electricity production. The climate subprogramme will provide €864 million in co-financing for climate projects between 2014 and 2020.  Its main objectives are to contribute to the shift towards a low carbon and climate resilient economy and improve the development, implementation and enforcement of EU climate change policies and laws.

In March of the year 2020 a draft of a climate law for the entire European Union was proposed. The law obliges the European Union to become carbon neutral by 2050 and adjust all its policies to the target. The law includes measures to increase the use of trains. The law includes a mechanism to check the implementation of the needed measures. It also should increase the climate ambitions of other countries. It includes a Carbon Border Adjustment Mechanism, that will prevent Carbon leakage. Greta Thunberg and other climate activists have criticized the draft saying it has not enough strong targets.

In July 2021 The European Union published several drafts describing concrete measures to achieve climate neutrality by 2050. Those include tax on jet fuel, a ban on selling cars on petrol and diesel by 2035, border tax, measures for increase energy efficiency in buildings and renewable energy.

Climate initiatives, according to 56% of Europeans, are a source of economic growth. 56% of Europeans also believe that climate change mitigation will produce more employment. 61% of Europeans believe that climate change policies will improve their quality of life.

In May 2022 the European Commission proposed a plan that includes measures for speeding emission reduction. The plan includes reducing energy consumption by 13% by the year 2030, reducing oil and gas use by 5% with behavioural changes already in the short time, increase use of biogas and heat pumps. According to the plan, 45% of energy in the European Union should come from renewable sources by 2030.

In the summer of 2022 the leaders of the union adopted basic elements of the proposition of the European Commission aiming to reduce the emissions of the union by 61% by the year 2030.

The European Commission predicted in 2020 that extra investment of €260 billion year, or around 2% of EU GDP, would be needed to meet the 2030 climate and energy objectives. Since then, the aim for reducing greenhouse gas emissions for the year 2030 has grown (from -40% to -55%), necessitating both more investment and the acceleration of some expenditures.

Approximately 57% of EU businesses are investing in energy efficiency, 64% in reducing and recycling trash, and 32% in less polluting industries and technologies. Roughly 40% of businesses made investments in energy efficiency in 2021. About 90% of EU businesses previously made an effort to cut greenhouse gas emissions.

European Union Emissions Trading System
The European Union Emissions Trading System is a major pillar of EU energy policy. It was the first large greenhouse gas emissions trading scheme in the world and was launched in 2005 to fight global warming. In 2022, the EU ETS covers emissions from power and heat generation, energy-intensive industrial sectors and commercial aviation within Europe.

Under the "cap and trade" principle, a maximum (cap) is set on the total amount of greenhouse gases that can be emitted by all participating installations. EU Allowances for emissions are then auctioned off or allocated for free, and can subsequently be traded. Installations must monitor and report their CO2 emissions, ensuring they hand in enough allowances to the authorities to cover their emissions. If emission exceeds what is permitted by its allowances, an installation must purchase allowances from others. Conversely, if an installation has performed well at reducing its emissions, it can sell its leftover credits. This allows the system to find the most cost-effective ways of reducing emissions without significant government intervention.
The current EU ETS cap aims to reduce GHG emissions by 43% in 2030 against 2005 emissions, but in the "Fit for 55" package, the EU commission proposes to increase the reduction target for 2030 to -61% compared to 2005 emissions.

Stern report 2006
British government and economist Nicholas Stern published the Stern report in 2006. The Review states that climate change is the greatest and widest-ranging market failure ever seen, presenting a unique challenge for economics. The Review provides prescriptions including environmental taxes to minimize the economic and social disruptions. The Stern Review's main conclusion is that the benefits of strong, early action on climate change far outweigh the costs of not acting. The Review points to the potential impacts of climate change on water resources, food production, health, and the environment. According to the Review, without action, the overall costs of climate change will be equivalent to losing at least 5% of global gross domestic product (GDP) each year, now and forever. Including a wider range of risks and impacts could increase this to 20% of GDP or more.

No-one can predict the consequences of climate change with complete certainty; but we now know enough to understand the risks. The review leads to a simple conclusion: the benefits of strong, early action considerably outweigh the costs.

Climate emergency 
The EU parliament declared a climate emergency in November 2019. It urged all EU countries to commit to net zero greenhouse gas emissions by 2050. MEPs backed a tougher target of cutting greenhouse gas emissions by 55% by 2030. The vote came as scientists warned that the world may have already crossed a series of climate tipping points, resulting in “a state of planetary emergency”. The parliament also calls to end all fossil fuel subsidies by 2020, increase at least twice the payments to the green climate fund, make sure that all the legislation and the European budget will be in line with the 1.5 degrees target, and reduce emissions from aviation and shipping.

Divestment from fossil fuels and sustainable investments 

The European Investment Bank declared that it will divest almost completely from fossil fuels from the year 2021 and started to phase out acceptance of new projects in 2019.

The central bank of Sweden sold its bonds in the provinces of Queensland, Western Australia in Australia and the province Alberta from Canada because of severe climate impacts from those provinces.

In November 2019, the European parliament adopted resolutions calling to end all subsidies of fossil fuels by 2020.

In 2019 the European Parliament created rules for identification of sustainable investments. The measure should help achieve climate neutral Europe.

27% of companies in less developed areas report that climate change is having a big impact on their business, while 40% have a slight impact. Only 19% and 43%, respectively, of businesses in transition zones claim that climate change is significantly affecting their business.  Less developed regions also have the lowest percentage of businesses who have made investments to combat climate change or reduce their carbon emissions (46%).

Green recovery from the COVID-19 pandemic 
In May 2020, the €750 billion European recovery package and the €1 trillion budget were announced, the European Green Deal being part of it. The money will be spent only on projects that meet some green criteria; 25% of all funding will go to climate change mitigation. Fossil fuels and nuclear power are excluded from the funding. The recovery package should also restore some equilibrium between rich and poor countries in the European Union. In July the recovery package and the budget were generally accepted, and budget allocation going to climate action was raised to 30%. The plan includes some green taxation on European products and on imports. Critics say it is still not enough for achieving the climate targets of the European Union and it is not clear how to ensure that all the money will really go to green projects.

Nature restoration and agriculture 
In May 2020, the European Union published 2 plans that are part of the European Green Deal: The EU Biodiversity Strategy for 2030 and From Farm to Fork.

In the official page of the EU Biodiversity Strategy for 2030 is cited Ursula von der Leyen, President of the European Commission, saying that:

The biodiversity strategy is an essential part of the climate change mitigation strategy of the European Union. From the 25% of the European budget that will go to fight climate change, large parts will go to restore biodiversity and nature based solutions.

The EU Biodiversity Strategy for 2030 include the next targets:

 Protect 30% of the sea territory and 30% of the land territory especially Old-growth forests. 
 Plant 3 billion trees by the year 2030.
 Restore at least 25,000 kilometers of rivers, so they will become free flowing.
 Reduce the use of Pesticides by 50% by the year 2030.
 Increase Organic farming. 
 Increase Biodiversity in agriculture.
 Give €20 billion per year to the issue and make it part of the business practice.

According to the page, approximately half of the global GDP depends on nature. In Europe many parts of the economy that generate trillions of Euros per year, depend on nature. Only the benefits of Natura 2000 in Europe are €200 - €300 billion per year.

In the official page of the program From Farm to Fork is cited Frans Timmermans the Executive Vice-president of the European Commission, saying that:

The program include the next targets:
 
 Making 25% of EU agriculture organic, by the year 2030.
 Reduce by 50% the use of Pesticides by the year 2030.
 Reduce the use of Fertilizers by 20% by the year 2030.
 Reduce nutrient loss by at least 50%.
 Reduce the use of antimicrobials in agriculture and antimicrobials in aquaculture by 50% by 2030.
 Create sustainable food labeling.
 Reduce food waste by 50% by 2030.
 Dedicate to R&I related to the issue €10 billion.

In 2022 the Environment Ministers of the European Union backed a new law aiming to increase carbon sinks such as forests.

In 2022 The European parliament approved a bill aiming to stop the import linked with deforestation. The bill requires from companies who want to import 14 products: soy, beef, palm oil, timber, cocoa, coffee, pork, lamb, goat meat, poultry, corn, rubber, charcoal, and printed paper to the European Union to prove the production of those commodities is not linked to areas deforested after 31 of December 2019. Without it the import will be forbidden. The bill may cause to Brazil, for example, to stop deforestation for agricultural production and begun to "increase productivity on existing agricultural land".

Transport 

In 2022, the leaders of the union agreed to ban sales of cars emitting  from the year 2035.

In December 2022 the European Commission approved a law forbidding flights on planes in France, if people can pass the distance on a train in 2.5 hours. Greenpeace demanded to extend the law, by following the advice of the European Commission to include connecting flights. Greenpeace cited a report according to which, if it will be 6 hours instead of 2.5, it will cut global greenhouse gas emissions by an amount equivalent to 3.5 million tonnes  annually.

Adaptation 

Climate change threatens to undermine decades of development gains in Europe and put at risk efforts to eradicate poverty. In 2013, the European Union adopted the 'EU Adaptation Strategy', which had three key objectives: (1) promoting action by member states, which includes providing funding, (2) promoting adaptation in climate-sensitive sectors and (3) research.

The study from 15,951 survey participants across 27 European nations has shown "that only respondents who are certain of global warming and believe that it is mostly anthropogenic show a significantly higher willingness to donate to a climate action fund". These results point to the importance of tackling climate denial and better communicating climate science.

Society and culture

Public opinion 

The majority of individuals in the eastern EU countries are relatively less positive about the influence of climate measures on the employment market. 55% of Eastern Europeans believe that measures against climate change will result in less jobs. In Western Europe, 60% of respondents believe that policies would generate more jobs.

62% of Europeans believe that the green transition will reduce their buying power.

66% of Europeans believe the climate emergency will be a severe problem by the mid-century, and 30% believe that the climate emergency will be under control by 2050.

Europeans believe climate change is a threat, with 29% of the EU population expecting to be forced to relocate to another area. People of ages 20–29 are concerned about the potential of having to relocate due to climate challenges. Because of climate change, 33% of Europeans feel they will have to relocate to a colder or warmer area or nation, according to the European Investment Bank's climate survey in 2020.

In European Investment Bank's Climate Survey of 2020, 90% of Europeans believe their children will experience the effects of climate change in their daily lives. The survey showed a high concern for the climate from the 30 000 individuals surveyed, explaining that a majority of respondents are also prepared to pay a new tax in accordance with climate laws. Only 9% of Europeans do not think climate change is occurring, compared to 18% in the United States.

Activism 

The critics include that European companies, like in other OECD countries, have moved the energy-intensive, polluting, and climate gas-emitting industry to Asia and South America. In respect to climate change there are no harmless areas. Carbon emissions from all countries are equal. The agreements exclude significant factors like deforestation, aviation and tourism, the actual end consumption of energy and the history of emissions. Negotiations are country oriented but the economical interests are in conflict between the energy producers, consumers and the environment.

In the EU, 75% of the population claims they are more worried about the climate crisis than their politicians. 51% of EU citizens cite government inaction as a major difficulty when facing the climate crisis, and 81% cite climate change as the most serious problem of the twenty-first century.

Climate change is also a factor when job searching, according to 54% of young Europeans.

As a form of climate action, 42% of Europeans, specifically 48% of women and 34% of men, invest in second-hand clothing rather than buying new. Younger populations, aged 15 to 29, were found more likely to do so than older generations.

33% of car buyers in Europe will also opt for a petrol / diesel car when purchasing a new vehicle. 67% of them mentioned opting for the hybrid or electric version. In the EU, only 13% of the total population do not plan on owning a vehicle at all.

44% of Europeans aged 20–29 fear they could lose their jobs because of climate change.

Europeans expect lifestyle changes to experience great transformation in the next 20 years. 31% of respondents to an EU climate survey believe that most people will no longer have their own vehicle. 63% believe that teleworking will become the norm in the fight against climate change. 36% of respondents believe most people will no longer consume animal products. 48% predict that energy quotas will be individually assigned.

School strike for climate 

School strikes for climate became well known when the Swedish teen Greta Thunberg started to strike in the summer of 2018 and starting from September 2018 she began to strike every Friday. The movement started to pick up in January 2019 with mass strikes happened in Belgium, Germany and Switzerland. In the following months mass strikes were reported in numerous European countries. There were numerous global climate strikes that also took place in Europe on 15 March 2019, 24 May 2019, from 20 to 27 September 2019 (global climate action week), 29 November 2019 and 25 September 2020. The strikes during 2020 were limited because of COVID-19.

Extinction Rebellion 

Extinction Rebellion (XR) was founded in 2018 in the United Kingdom and is a civil disobedience movement. Their first planned action was in London were 5000 demonstrators blocked the most important bridges of the city. The movement quickly spread around Europe. In October 2019 there was the first global rebellion with numerous demonstrations in European cities.

By country

Austria 

At the beginning of the year 2020, major parties in Austria reach a deal, including achieving carbon - neutrality of the country by 2040, produce all electricity from renewable sources by 2030, making a nationwide carbon tax and making a tax on flying, what should making trains more attractive.

In 2020 the latest coal fired power station in the country was closed. Austria became the second country in Europe, after Belgium to become coal free. The goal of achieving 100% renewable electrycity by 2030 was adopted by government

Belgium

Bosnia and Herzegovina

Croatia 
Croatia aims to reduce  emissions by 45% by 2030 and phase out coal by 2033. However, the shift to a low-carbon economy will necessitate significant expenditures in new energy infrastructure and additional renewable energy resources.

Croatia established a 2030 National Energy and Climate Plan to attain its aim. The national policy targets for a 36.4% renewable energy share by 2030, as well as major investment in the energy industry, including hydropower, wind farms, solar photovoltaic facilities, and hydrogen energy.

Cyprus

Denmark 

In 2019 Denmark passed a law in which its pledge to reduce GHG emissions by 70% by 2030 from the level in 1990. It also pledged to achieve zero emissions by 2050. The law includes strong monitoring system and setting intermediate targets every 5 years. It includes a pledge to help climate action in other countries and consider climate impacts in diplomatic and economic relations with other countries.

Greenland is an autonomous territory within Denmark. In 2021 Greenland banned all new oil and gas exploration on its territory. The government of Greenland explained the decision as follows: "price of oil extraction is too high,"

Finland

France

Germany

Iceland 

Iceland has a target of becoming carbon neutral by 2040. It wants to reduce its greenhouse gas emissions by 40% by the year 2030.

Ireland

Italy 

In 2019, Italy became the first country in the world to introduce mandatory lessons about sustainability and climate change. The lessons will be taught in all schools, in the ages 6 –19, one hour each week. According to the European Investment Bank climate survey from 2020, 70% of Europeans have either switched to a green energy supplier or are prepared to do so. This ratio is 82% in Italy.

Netherlands

Norway

Russia

Sweden

Spain

Turkey

Ukraine 

The EU is trying to support a move away from coal.

United Kingdom

See also 

 Climate of Europe
 Eco-Management and Audit Scheme
 Energy policy of the European Union
 Environmental policy of the European Union
 European Federation for Transport and Environment
 European Pollutant Emission Register (EPER)
 European Union Emission Trading Scheme
 List of European power companies by carbon intensity
 Plug-in electric vehicles in Europe
 Renewable energy in the European Union

References

External links 
 Climate change in the EU.
 Climate Action

 
Natural disasters in Europe
Eur
Carbon emissions in the European Union